Chiridopsis marginata, is a species of leaf beetle found in India, and Sri Lanka.

It is seed borer of mango.

Subspecies
Two subspecies recognized.

 Chiridopsis marginata ornata - India
 Chiridopsis marginata marginata - Sri Lanka, South India

References 

Cassidinae
Insects of Sri Lanka
Beetles described in 1901